Sunan Sa'id ibn Mansur, or Sunan Sa'id bin Mansur or Sunan Sayeed bin Mansur, is one of the Hadith book compiled in third century of the Muslim calendar. It was written by Imam Sa'id ibn Mansur (died in 227 AH).

Description
It contains almost three thousand (3000) hadiths according to Maktaba Shamila. It is one of the oldest Musnad (a kind of Hadith book) written. It is written in third century of Islamic calendar and written before the Sahihain: (Sahih al-Bukhari and Sahih Muslim). The book was famous among the scholars.

Publications
The book has been published by many organizations around the world: 
   Sunan Sa‘īd ibn Manṣūr (8 v.)by Sa‘īd ibn Manṣūr : Published: al-Riyāḍ : Dār al-Ṣumay‘ī lil-Nashr wa-al-Tawzī‘, 1993–2012.

See also
 List of Sunni books
 Kutub al-Sittah
 Sahih Muslim
 Jami al-Tirmidhi
 Sunan Abu Dawood
 Jami' at-Tirmidhi
 Either: Sunan ibn Majah, Muwatta Malik

References

9th-century Arabic books
10th-century Arabic books
Sunni literature
Hadith
Hadith collections
Sunni hadith collections
Taba‘ at-Tabi‘in hadith narrators